Tarlac City held local elections on May 13, 2013, within the Philippine general election. The voters elected candidates for mayor, vice mayor, and ten councilors. Incumbent mayor Gelacio Manalang won the elections, securing him to serve his second three-year term as the mayor of Tarlac City. Manalang defeated former mayor Genaro Mendoza, former city administrator and health officer Jerome Lapeña, and incumbent 2nd district provincial board member Danilo Asiaten.

Manalang's running mate, the incumbent vice mayor Mike Tañedo, topped the vice mayoral race, securing him to serve his second three-year term as the city's vice mayor. Tañedo defeated incumbent city councilor Ana Aguas by a wide margin. Affiliated with the Liberal Party during the previous election, Tañedo switched his party affiliation to Lakas-CMD during his second term.

In the city council elections, Mendoza's Team Magsikap (LP-NPC) coalition won seven seats while Manalang's Tuloy Sigla coalition got three seats.

Candidates
Parties are as stated in their certificate of candidacies.

Team Tuloy Sigla

Team Magsikap

Others

Mayoral and vice mayoral elections
The candidates for mayor and vice mayor with the highest number of votes wins the seat; they are voted separately, therefore, they may be of different parties when elected.

Mayor

Vice Mayor

City Council elections
Tarlac City elected Sangguniang Panlungsod or city council members. A voter votes for up to ten candidates, then the ten candidates with the highest number of votes are elected.  Election is via plurality-at-large voting.

Results per candidate

 
 
 
 
 
 
 
 
 
 
|-
|colspan=5 bgcolor=black|

References

External links
COMELEC - Official website of the Philippine Commission on Elections (COMELEC)
NAMFREL - Official website of National Movement for Free Elections (NAMFREL)
PPCRV - Official website of the Parish Pastoral Council for Responsible Voting (PPCRV)

 
2013 Philippine local elections
Tarlac City